NASA Astronaut Group 22 (nicknamed "The Turtles") is a group of twelve NASA astronauts selected in June 2017. They were joined by two Canadian Space Agency astronauts for training.

History

NASA announced the creation of this astronaut group in November 2015 and accepted applications for astronaut hires from December 2015 through February 2016. A record number of applications - over 18,300 - were received. The final group of twelve selected candidates was publicly announced on June 7, 2017. The class was introduced at a press conference at the Johnson Space Center by U. S. Vice President Mike Pence. The ages of the seven men and six women ranged from 29 to 42 at the time of announcement.

The Group 22 astronaut candidates arrived at the Johnson Space Center in Houston for training in August 2017, and when their approximately two-year-long training program was complete in January 2020, they became available for future missions.

The group earned their "Turtles" nickname after experiencing flooding from Hurricane Harvey shortly after arriving at NASA. The name was chosen by the preceding astronaut group, "The 8-Balls", according to NASA traditions.

The first astronauts of this astronaut group to fly to space, Raja Chari and Kayla Barron on SpaceX Crew-3 took a toy stuffed turtle as zero-g indicator, to pay a tribute to their astronaut group.

Group members
 Kayla Barron (born 1987): Lt. Cmdr., U.S. Navy
 Mission specialist, SpaceX Crew-3 (Expedition 66/67)
 Zena Cardman (born 1987): Biologist
 Raja Chari (born 1977): Col., U.S. Air Force
 Spacecraft commander, SpaceX Crew-3 (Expedition 66/67)
 Matthew Dominick (born 1981): Cmdr., U.S. Navy
 Bob Hines (born 1975): NASA research pilot
 Pilot, SpaceX Crew-4 (Expedition 67)
 Warren Hoburg (born 1985): assistant professor of Aeronautics and Astronautics, MIT
 Pilot, SpaceX Crew-6 (Expedition 68/69)
 Jonny Kim (born 1984): LCDR, U.S. Navy, physician, former U.S. Navy SEAL
 Robb Kulin (born 1983): Launch Chief Engineer, SpaceX – Resigned in August 2018 before completing his training.
 Jasmin Moghbeli (born 1983): LtCol., U.S. Marine Corps
 Future Flight, SpaceX Crew-7
 Loral O'Hara (born 1983): research engineer, Woods Hole Oceanographic Institution
 Future Flight, Soyuz MS-24
 Francisco Rubio (born 1975): Maj., U.S. Army physician
 Mission specialist, Soyuz MS-22/MS-23 (Expedition 67/68/69)
 Jessica Watkins (born 1988): postdoctoral fellow, California Institute of Technology
 Mission specialist, SpaceX Crew-4 (Expedition 67/68)

Canadian partner astronauts
The U.S. astronauts trained alongside two Canadian astronaut candidates:
 Joshua Kutryk (born 1982): LCol, Royal Canadian Air Force, test pilot, fighter pilot, engineer
 Jenni Sidey-Gibbons (born 1988): Mechanical engineer, combustion scientist, and lecturer

References

External links

Turtles class nickname

Lists of astronauts
NASA Astronaut Corps